Dae Sung Lee (born 1958) is a Korean-American master of taekwondo who holds the rank of 7th dan. Lee is a 10-time US national taekwondo team member and two-time Olympic coach. He served as taekwondo coach for the US Summer Olympic team in 1992.

Early life
Lee was born in 1958 in Seoul, South Korea, and began studying taekwondo at the age of 11. He moved to Hawaii in 1971 with his family. Lee graduated from Moanalua High School in 1977 and obtained a bachelor's degree from the University of Hawaii at Manoa in 1987, double majoring in political science and physical education.

Lee considers masters Randy Kuk Do Chun of Honolulu and Sang Chul Lee of Colorado Springs as his main teachers. Both Chun and Lee came from the Jidokwan style of taekwondo.

Competitive taekwondo career
Lee is a nine-time US National Champion (1979–1987), a 10-time US National Team Member (1979–1987, 1989), and has won medals at the World Taekwondo Championships, World Games, International Collegiate Taekwondo Championships, Pan American Games, and Pan American Taekwondo Championships. His competition record includes:
 1989: US Taekwondo Team Trials (Fin): gold
 1988: US Taekwondo Team Trials (Fin): silver
 1987: World Taekwondo Championships (Fin): bronze; Pan American Games (Fin): gold; US Taekwondo Team Trials (Fin): gold; US Taekwondo National Championships (Fin): gold
 1986: World Cup Taekwondo Championships (Fin): bronze; US Taekwondo National Championships (Fin): gold
 1985: World Taekwondo Championships (Fin): silver; World Games Taekwondo (Fin): bronze; US Taekwondo National Championships (Fin): gold
 1984: Pan American Taekwondo Championships (Fly): gold; US Taekwondo National Championships (Fly): gold
 1983: International Collegiate Taekwondo Championships (Fin): gold; US Taekwondo National Championships (Fin): gold
 1982: Pan American Taekwondo Championships (Fin): gold; World Taekwondo Championships (Fin): bronze; US Taekwondo National Championships (Fin): gold
 1981: World Games Taekwondo (Fin): silver; US Taekwondo National Championships (Fin): gold
 1980: AAU Tae Kwon Do National Championships (Fin): gold
 1979: World Taekwondo Championships (Fin): bronze; US Taekwondo National Championships (Fin): gold
 1977: US Taekwondo National Championships (Fly): bronze

Coaching career
Lee served as an assistant taekwondo coach for the USA at the 1988 Summer Olympics  and as taekwondo coach for the USA at the 1992 Summer Olympics. He was also head coach of the Colorado Springs Olympic Training Center's Resident Athlete Program for taekwondo from 1988–1993. Lee has operated the US Taekwondo Center in Aina Haina from 1993 to early 2000 and has trained over 10,000 students. In 2004, he was removed from the position of taekwondo coach for the USA team due to compete at the Summer Olympics in Athens.

Lee was also active in the United States Taekwondo Union (USTU), holding positions on the Athlete's Advisory Committee and serving as Chairman of the USTU's Tournament Committee and Junior Olympic Committee. He was a founding member of the United States Taekwondo Committee (USTC), which was created in August 2007, and had served as Secretary General of the organization. In 2007, Lee was approached by the Chinese Taekwondo Association to coach the Chinese Olympic Taekwondo Team for the 2008 Beijing Olympic Games. Lee accepted and relocated to Beijing, China, for the one year period leading up to the event. Lee served as the Chinese Team's Head Coach at the 2007 World Taekwondo Championships, the 2007 Korea Open Taekwondo Championships, the Good Luck Beijing 2008 International Taekwondo Invitational Tournament, and the 2008 Beijing Olympic Games. His international coaching record includes:
 2008: Beijing Olympic Games; Good Luck Beijing 2008 International Taekwondo Invitational Tournament
 2007: Korea Open Taekwondo Championships; World Taekwondo Championships
 2003: World Taekwondo Championships; US Open Taekwondo Championships
 2002: US Open Taekwondo Championships
 2001: World Taekwondo Championships; US Open Taekwondo Championships
 2000: US Open Taekwondo Championships
 1999: World Olympic Qualification Tournament; World Taekwondo Championships; US Open Taekwondo Championships
 1998: US Open Taekwondo Championships
 1997: World Taekwondo Championships; US Open Taekwondo Championships
 1996: US Open Taekwondo Championships
 1995: World Taekwondo Championships; US Open Taekwondo Championships
 1994: US Open Taekwondo Championships
 1993: World Taekwondo Championships; US Open Taekwondo Championships
 1992: Barcelona Olympic Games; US Open Taekwondo Championships
 1991: World Taekwondo Championships
 1989: World Taekwondo Championships
 1988: Seoul Olympic Games

On February 24, 2009, Lee was inducted into the Hawaii Sports Hall of Fame as a longtime contributor to taekwondo in Hawaii.

Personal
Since 1993, Lee has been married to Heon Mi Lee, and they have two children: Nikita and Daven Lee.

See also
List of Korean Americans

References

External links 
 Isle coach sues over Olympic team role: The lawsuit fights his ouster as U.S. coach for tae kwon do

1958 births
Living people
American male taekwondo practitioners
Pan American Games medalists in taekwondo
Pan American Games gold medalists for the United States
Taekwondo practitioners at the 1987 Pan American Games
Medalists at the 1987 Pan American Games
World Taekwondo Championships medalists